Pap is a given name. Notable people with the given name include:

 Pap of Armenia (353–374), Armenian prince
 Pap Saine, Gambian newspaper editor and publisher
 Pap Cheyassin Secka (1942–2012), Gambian lawyer, politician, and Attorney General of the Gambia

Masculine given names